An Open Archival Information System (or OAIS) is an archive, consisting of an organization of people and systems, that has accepted the responsibility to preserve information and make it available for a Designated Community.  The OAIS model can be applied to various archives, e.g., open access, closed, restricted, “dark”, or proprietary. 

The term OAIS also refers, by extension, to the  ISO OAIS Reference Model for an OAIS. This reference model is defined by recommendation CCSDS 650.0-B-2 of the Consultative Committee for Space Data Systems; this text is identical to = 57284 ISO 14721:2012. The CCSDS's purview is space agencies, but the OAIS model it developed has proved useful to other organizations and institutions with digital archiving needs.  OAIS, known as ISO 14721:2003, is widely accepted and utilized by various organizations and disciplines, both national and international, and was designed to ensure preservation.  The OAIS standard, published in 2005, is considered the optimum standard to create and maintain a digital repository over a long period of time.

The information being maintained has been deemed to need "long term preservation," even if the OAIS itself is not permanent. "Long term" is long enough to be concerned with the impacts of changing technologies, including support for new  media and data formats, or with a changing user community. "Long term" may extend indefinitely.  The OAIS defines a long period of time as any length of time that might be impacted by changing technologies and the changing of “Designated Community,” e.g., any group of consumers capable of understanding the information. This length of time can be indefinite.  The archive defines the community and that definition is not fixed.

The “O” in OAIS represents the “open way the standard was developed,” and does not represent “open access”, or the usage of the term open in the Open Definition or Open Archives Initiative. The “I” in OAIS represents “information,” meaning data that can be shared or exchanged.

In this reference model there is a particular focus on digital information, both as the primary forms of information held and as supporting information for both digitally and physically archived materials. Therefore, the model accommodates information that is inherently non-digital (e.g., a physical  sample), but the modeling and preservation of such information is not addressed in detail. As strictly a conceptual framework, the OAIS model does not require the use of any particular computing platform, system environment, system design paradigm, system development methodology, database management system, database design paradigm, data definition language, command language, system interface, user interface, technology, or media for an archive to be compliant. Its aim is to set the standard for the activities that are involved in preserving a digital archive rather than the method for carrying out those activities.

The acronym OAIS should not be confused with OAI, which is the Open Archives Initiative.

The reference model
The reference model:

 provides a  framework for the understanding and increased awareness of archival concepts needed for long term digital information preservation and access.
 provides the concepts needed by non-archival organizations to be effective participants in the preservation process.
 provides a framework, including terminology and concepts, for describing and comparing architectures and operations of existing and future archives.
 provides a framework for describing and comparing different long term preservation strategies and techniques.
 provides a basis for comparing the data models of digital information preserved by Archives and for discussing how data models and the underlying information may change over time.
 provides a foundation that may be expanded by other efforts to cover long-term preservation of information that is not in digital form (e.g., physical media and physical samples).
 expands consensus on the elements and processes for long-term digital information preservation and access, and promotes a larger market which vendors can support.
 guides the identification and production of OAIS-related standards.

Requirements of the system
The reference model ( ISO 14721:2003) includes the following responsibilities that an OAIS archive must abide by:
Negotiate for and accept appropriate information from information Producers.
Obtain sufficient control of the information provided to the level needed to ensure Long-Term Preservation.
Determine, either by itself or in conjunction with other parties, which communities should become the Designated Community and, therefore, should be able to understand the information provided.
Ensure that the information to be preserved is Independently Understandable to the Designated Community. In other words, the community should be able to understand the information without needing the assistance of the experts who produced the information.
Follow documented policies and procedures which ensure that the information is preserved against all reasonable contingencies, and which enable the information to be disseminated as authenticated copies of the original, or as traceable to the original.
Make the preserved information available to the Designated Community.

The OAIS environment and information model

The OAIS environment involves the interaction of four entities: producers of information, consumers of information (or the designated community), management, and the archive itself. The management component of the OAIS environment is not an entity that carries out day-to-day maintenance of an archive but a person or group that sets policies for the content contained in the archive.

The OAIS model also defines an information model. Physical or digital items which contain information are known as data objects. Members of the Designated Community for an archive should be able to interpret and understand the information contained in a data object either because of their established knowledge base or with the assistance of supplementary "representation information" that is included with the data object.

An information package includes the following information objects:
 Content Information: this includes the data object and its representation information
 Preservation Description Information: contains information necessary to preserve its affiliated content information (such as information about the item's provenance, unique identifiers, a Checksum or other authentication data, etc.)
 Packaging Information: holds the components of the information package together
 Descriptive Information: metadata about the object which allows the object to be located at a later time using the archive's search or retrieval functions
There are three types of information package in the OAIS reference model: 
 Submission Information Package (SIP): which is the information sent from the producer to the archive
 Archival Information Package (AIP): which is the information stored by the archive
 Dissemination Information Package (DIP): which is the information sent to a user when requested
These three information packages may or may not be identical to each other.

The functional model

There are six functional entities in an OAIS:
 Ingest function: receives information from producers and packages it for storage. It accepts a SIP, verifies it, creates an AIP from the SIP, and transfers the newly created AIP to archival storage
 Archival Storage function: stores, maintains, and retrieves AIPs. It accepts AIPs submitted from the Ingest function, assigns them to long term storage, migrates AIPs as needed, checks for errors, and provides requested AIPs to the Access function
 Data Management function: coordinates the Descriptive Information of the AIPs and the system information that supports the archive. It maintains the database that contains the archive's information by executing query requests and generating results; generates reports in support of other functions; and updates the database.
 Administration function: manages the daily operations of the archive. This function attains submission agreements from information producers, performs system engineering, audits SIPs to ensure compliance with submission agreements, develops policies and standards. It handles customer service and acts as the interface between Management and the Designated Community in the OAIS environment.
 Preservation Planning function: supports all tasks to keep the archive material accessible and understandable over long terms even if the original computing system becomes obsolete, e.g. development of detailed preservation/migration plans, technology watch, evaluation and risk analysis of content and recommendation of update and migration.
 Access function: This function includes the user interface that allows users to retrieve information from the archive. It generates a DIP from the relevant AIP and delivers it to the customer who has requested the information.

Adoption
Although originally developed by the Consultative Committee for Space Data Systems, a body dedicated to overseeing space agencies, as digital preservation has become a discipline unto itself, the OAIS has become the standard model for digital preservation systems at many institutions and organizations. OAIS-compliance has been a stated fundamental design requirement for major digital preservation and repository development efforts at the National Archives and Records Administration, Library of Congress, British Library, Bibliothèque nationale de France, National Library of the Netherlands, the Digital Curation Centre in the UK, OCLC (the Online Computer Library Center), the JSTOR (Journal Storage) scholarly journal archive, as well as several university library systems. Centre of Excellence for Digital Preservation,  C-DAC, India has implemented OAIS for National Cultural Audiovisual Archive (NCAA) which has been certified as Trusted Digital Repository as per ISO 16363: 2012 during November 2017. This initiative was a part of Indian  National Digital Preservation Program (NDPP). The OAIS has been the basis of numerous prominent digital preservation initiatives and standards including the Preservation Metadata: Implementation Strategies working group and the Trustworthy Repositories Audit & Certification (TRAC) document from OCLC. which was an initial draft of, and subsequently superseded by, CCSDS 652.1-M-2 of the Consultative Committee for Space Data Systems; this text is identical to ISO 16363:2012 which forms the basis of the ISO audit and certification of Trustworthy Repositories, more details about which are available here. The ISO 19165:1-2018 recommends the use of the Open Packaging Conventions to implement the Geospatial Package.

Software architecture model
As part of #WeMissiPres, Frank Obermeit, a computer scientist at the State Archives of Saxony-Anhalt, Germany, presented a software architecture model that fully implements the Open Archival Information System (OAIS) reference model on 22 September 2020. An appliance developed on the architecture model has been available since October 2020. The architecture model is based exclusively on de facto and de jure standards and the appliance developed according to it was realised exclusively with open source products. The three main standards are  Business Process Model and Notation (BPMN),  Representational State Transfer (REST) and  OpenID Connect (OIDC). Scalability, distributability and extensibility are further essential features and enable the use in organisations of different sizes.

See also
Data curation
Digital preservation
National Digital Library Program (NDLP)
National Digital Information Infrastructure and Preservation Program (NDIIPP)
CASPAR digital preservation project
Trustworthy Repositories Audit & Certification
 National Digital Preservation Program (NDPP),  India

References

 Reference Model for an Open Archival Information System (OAIS), Recommended Practice, CCSDS 650.0-M-2 (Magenta Book) Issue 2, June 2012
 = 580 Work co-ordinated by RLG and NARA on standard(s) for accreditation of archives. 
 Consultative Committee for Space Data Systems
  ISO 19165-1:2018 Geographic information -- Preservation of digital data and metadata -- Part 1: Fundamentals

Reference models
Online archives
Archival science
Consultative Committee for Space Data Systems
Digital preservation